In decision theory, a decision rule is said to dominate another if the performance of the former is sometimes better, and never worse, than that of the latter.

Formally, let  and  be two decision rules, and let  be the risk of rule  for parameter .

This defines a partial order on decision rules; the maximal elements with respect to this order are called admissible decision rules.

References

Decision theory